Pataal Bhairavi is a 1985 Indian Hindi-language swashbuckling fantasy film, produced by G. Hanumantha Rao by Padmalaya Studios, presented by Krishna and directed by K. Bapayya. It stars Jeetendra, Jaya Prada with music composed by Bappi Lahiri. The film is remake of the Telugu film Patala Bhairavi (1951), starring N. T. Rama Rao, Malathi, S. V. Ranga Rao.

Plot
Once upon a time, there was a kingdom, Ujjain, ruled by Maharaj Raja Vijay Singh (Pran), his only daughter Princess Indumati (Jayaprada) loves a dynamic guy Ramu (Jeetendra), who works as a gardener in the fort. Knowing it, Maharaj challenges Ramu to amass wealth equal to that of his to marry Indumati. Parallelly, a wizard, Mantrik Husair (Kader Khan) wants to achieve the power of Pataal Bhairavi which is in the form of the statuette and fulfills the wish of the person holding it. To acquire it, a dynamic person is required, Husair selects Ramu and traps him on an assurance that he will aid him in marrying the princess. Actually, his ploy is to sacrifice him before the Goddess to obtain the statuette. After making an adventurous journey, both of them reach there, when Ramu learns Husair's crooked plan, so, he clearly sacrifices him before Goddess and wins the statuette, consequently amassing the wealth. In return, Maharaj lives up to his promise and accepts for the alliance. Meanwhile, Husair's apprentice Sadajapa (Asrani) discovers his master death and brings him back to life. Upon resurrection, Husair steals the statuette and kidnaps Indumati. Ramu pledges to bring Indumati his wealth back and leaves in search of Husair. After crossing many hurdles, Ramu protects Indumati, recovers the statuette, and knocks out Husair. Finally, Ramu marries Indu and returns the statuette to the Goddess as it shouldn't be misused.

Cast
Jeetendra as Ramu
Jaya Prada as Princess Indumati
Dimple Kapadia as Yaskankya
Pran as Maharaja Vijay Singh
Amjad Khan as Vishwanath Chanchal
Kader Khan as Mantrik Husair
Asrani as Sadajappa
Shakti Kapoor as Hanuman 
Bindu as Maharani Swaroopa Devi
Nirupa Roy as Ramu's mother
Viju Khote as Chanchal's attendant
Prema Narayan as Nalini (Indumati's Attendant)
Silk Smitha as Dancer
Shoma Anand as Goddess Pataal Bhairavi
Manik Irani as Bilkalma

Soundtrack 
Lyrics: Indeevar

References

External links
 

1985 films
1980s Hindi-language films
Indian fantasy drama films
1980s fantasy drama films
Films directed by K. Bapayya
Films scored by Bappi Lahiri
Hindi remakes of Telugu films
Indian swashbuckler films